Diana Lois Hendry (born 2 October 1941 in Wirral) is an English poet, children's author and short story writer. She won a Whitbread Award (now the Costa Prize) in 1991 and was again shortlisted for the prize in 2012.

Background

Hendry was born in the Wirral, England, one of three children. She worked for a time as a journalist in print and radio, including a post at The Western Mail in Cardiff (1960–65).

She took a degree when she was 39 years old at the University of Bristol. She wrote "As luck would have it my professor’s wife was the author Diana Wynne Jones, who saw my writing and suggested a publisher." This began a successful writing career. She taught English at a boys' school and later creative writing at the University of Bristol (1995–97).

Hendry has written over 40 books for children, including Harvey Angell, which won a Whitbread Award in 1991. She won first prize in the 1996 Housman Society Competition for her poetry and was writer in residence at Dumfries and Galloway Royal Infirmary (1997-1998). Her collections of poetry for adults include Making Blue (Peterloo, 1995), Borderers (Peterloo, 2001) and Twelve Lilts: Psalms & Responses (Mariscat Press, 2003) and Late Love: And Other Whodunnits (2008). Her book The Seeing, inspired by her childhood memories of the war, was shortlisted for the Scottish Children's Book Award (2013). She tutors at the Arvon Foundation and writes for the Spectator.

Hendry lives in Edinburgh with her partner Hamish Whyte of Mariscat Press. She has two children and three grandchildren. Her influences include novelist Charles Langbridge Morgan, Albert Camus, Muriel Spark, Elizabeth Bishop and Seamus Heaney. She enjoys yoga and playing the piano.

Awards and honours
1976: First prize Stroud International Poetry Competition
1985: Short-listed for the Smartie Award
1993: Second prize Peterloo Poetry Competition 1993
1991: Whitbread Award (for children's novel) 1991
1996: First prize Housman Society Poetry Competition
2001: Scottish Arts Council Children's Book Award
2002: Scottish Arts Council Award
2007: Robert Louis Stevenson Fellowship (with Hamish Whyte)
2008: Fellow at University of Edinburgh, Science and Engineering
2009: Fellow at Office of Lifelong Learning, University of Edinburgh
2013: Shortlisted for the Costa Award
2013: Shortlisted for the Scottish Children's Book Award

Works

Poetry collections
Making Blue, Peterloo Poets, 1995
Borderers, Peterloo Poets, 2001
Twelve Lilts: Psalms & Responses, Mariscat Press 2003
Sparks! (with Tom Pow), Mariscat Press 2005
Late Love and Other Whodunnits, Peterloo/Mariscat Press, 2008
The Seed-Box Lantern: New & Selected Poems 2013

Children's fiction: selected
The Very Noisy Night, illustrated by Jane Chapman. Little Tiger Press, 1998
The Very Busy Day, illustrated by Jane Chapman Little Tiger Press, 2001
The Very Snowy Christmas, illustrated by Jane Chapman. Little Tiger Press, 2005
Oodles of Noodles, illustrated by Sarah Massini.  Little Tiger Press, 2008
Harvey Angell, Julia MacRae/Walker Books, 1991; Red Fox, 2003 and 2012
Harvey Angell and the Ghost Child, MacRae/Red Fox 1997, 2003 and 2012
Harvey Angell Beats Time, Red Fox, 2003 and 2012
You Can’t Kiss it Better, Red Fox, 2003
The Seeing, Bodley Head, 2012

References

External links
Hendry at the Spectator 
Interview with Hendry ACHUKAbooks

1941 births
Living people
People from the Metropolitan Borough of Wirral
Costa Book Award winners
English short story writers
English women poets